Rencontre au Sommet. Dialogue between Anthony Burgess and Isaac Bashevis Singer is an 86-page book containing the complete transcripts of conversations between Anthony Burgess and Isaac Bashevis Singer when they met for a Swedish television documentary in 1985.

The transcripts were translated into French by Lili Sztajn and published by Mille Et Une Nuits in 1998 (Series: La petite collection, 205). 

The novelists discussed their respective religious experiences — Catholicism and Judaism — and their childhoods. They talked about God, the nature of evil, and the issue of free will in relation to Burgess's novel A Clockwork Orange. There was also a discussion of the Yiddish language in which both had a strong interest.

Notes

 

Books by Anthony Burgess
Books by Isaac Bashevis Singer
Jewish literature
1998 books